The Canadian Northern Corridor is a concept for a multi-modal (road, rail, pipeline, electrical transmission and communication) transportation corridor through Canada's North and Near-North. The concept is being studied jointly by academics at the University of Calgary School of Public Policy and CIRANO.

On June 21, 2017, The Standing Senate Committee on Banking, Trade and Commerce released a report entitled NATIONAL CORRIDOR ENHANCING AND FACILITATING COMMERCE AND INTERNAL TRADE that was a major endorsement of the NC concept.  In a press release issued simultaneously, the Committee called the NC concept a visionary project that could unlock extraordinary economic potential.

Research
In May 2016, the University of Calgary School of Public policy and CIRANO published a paper examining the potential for a Transportation Corridor (the Canadian Northern Corridor™) which would encompass an established right of way for transportation infrastructure based on local consultation and the negotiation of appropriate land usage rights. The initial paper also outlined the range of issues that required detailed study to determine the Corridor's viability. Additional scholarly work on the subject, coordinated by the University of Calgary, School of Public Policy, is intended to follow from this initial paper. They believe that by 2025 they can present this paper to the government of Canada.

Corridor
While no specific geographic path for the Canadian Northern Corridor has been formalized, the Corridor concept has been described as follows:
"In initial concept, the Northern Corridor would be approximately 7000 km in length. It would largely follow the boreal forest in the northern part of the west, with a spur along the Mackenzie Valley, and then southeast from the Churchill area to northern Ontario and the "Ring of Fire" area; the corridor would then traverse northern Quebec to Labrador, with augmented ports. The right-of-way would have room for roads, rail lines, pipelines and transmission lines, and would interconnect with the existing (southern- focused) transportation network."

Relation to previous studies
The concept is similar in scope, yet distinct from, the "Mid-Canada Corridor" proposed and studied by the Mid-Canada Development Foundation as chaired by Richard Rohmer.

Trademark
The Canadian Northern Corridor trademark application at the Canadian Intellectual Property Office was filed on April 29, 2019. On September 11, 2019 the Registrar of Trademarks gave public notice under subparagraph 9(1)(n)(ii) of the Trademarks Act of this prohibited mark.

References

 Rohmer, Richard (1970) "The green north" Maclean-Hunter

Proposed transport infrastructure in Canada
Subarctic
2016 documents
Rural development in North America
Megaprojects
Proposed ports
Energy security
Indigenous politics in Canada
Energy policy in North America